Epia madeira is a moth in the Bombycidae family. It was described by Schaus in 1920. It is found in Brazil.

References

Natural History Museum Lepidoptera generic names catalog

Bombycidae
Moths described in 1920